Margit Fischer (née Binder; born 28 June 1943) is the wife of Heinz Fischer, former president of Austria.

Fischer was born in Stockholm, Sweden. Her parents, Otto and Anna Binder, were social democrats and Jews and fled to Sweden during the Nazi regime. Mrs Fischer speaks Swedish fluently. In 1949, her family returned to Austria. She attended grammar school in Vienna and began studying arts at the University of Vienna. In 1968, she married Heinz Fischer, a social democratic politician.  In 2004, her husband was elected Austrian president and she became the first lady of Austria. The couple have two children: Philip (born 1972) and Lisa (born 1975).

Functions in Austria

 Former Vice-President of Rettet das Kind Österreich (Save the Children Austria) (1992-1998)
 Former President of Verein zur Gründung und zum Betrieb einer Erlebnisausstellung zu den Naturwissenschaften (Association for the creation and operation of an interactive exhibition about the natural sciences)  (1993-2000)
 Chairperson of Österreichischer Frauenrat (Austrian Women's Council) (since 1995)
 Chairperson of Science Center Netzwerk (Science Center Network Society) (since 2005)

Awards
 2006 -  — Grand Cross of Merit Order pro merito Melitensi of the Sovereign Military Order of Malta
 2007 -  - Knight Grand Cross of the Order of Merit of the Italian Republic
 2007 -  — Commander Grand Cross of the Order of the Polar Star
 2009 -  — Grand Cross of the Order of Saint James of the Sword
 2013 -  — Grand Cross of the Order of Adolphe of Nassau

References 

1943 births
Living people
Austrian Jews
Swedish Jews
Swedish expatriates in Austria
Spouses of presidents of Austria
People from Stockholm

Commanders Grand Cross of the Order of the Polar Star
Recipients of the Order pro Merito Melitensi